Church of the Exaltation of the Holy Cross - one of the oldest wooden churches of Ternopil Oblast, Ukraine, built in 1630. Its bell tower was built in the first half of the 18th century. Located in the area Kutets of Kopychyntsi Husiatyn Raion. The style is Ukrainian Baroque. It is an architectural monument of national importance. The founder of the church was Martin Ludetskyi, owner of the locality Kutets, that was a part of the Cossack Hetmanate or "Hetmanshchyna".

References

Sources 
 Карвовський Ст. Чотири тижні в Галичині // Духовні, історичні та природні перлини рідного краю: Буклет — путівник. — Склали та упоряд. Худзік О. Д., Сагайдак Л. Т. (Реценз. Гуменюк Я. С., Козачок Н. В.) — Відділ освіти Гусятинської РДА, 2012 — (Присвячено 120-річному ювілею патріарха УГКЦ Йосипа Сліпого).

Buildings and structures in Ternopil Oblast